Uwe Schmitt (17 August 1961 – 17 December 1995) was a German sprinter and hurdler.

At the 1979 European Junior Championships, he won a gold medal in the 4 × 400 metres relay. He competed in the 400 metres hurdles and 4 × 400 metres relay at the 1984 Summer Olympics representing West Germany. He also competed at the 1987 World Championships, but was knocked out in the heats.

In the 400 m hurdles, he won the silver medal at the 1985 West German championships behind the long-reigning Harald Schmid, and four bronze medals in 1983, 1984, 1986, and 1988. He represented the club Eintracht Frankfurt.

His personal best times were 46.19 seconds in the 400 metres and 49.39 seconds in the 400 metres hurdles, both achieved in August 1985 in Stuttgart.

He committed suicide by poison in 1995.

References

External links
 

1961 births
1995 suicides
Athletes (track and field) at the 1984 Summer Olympics
West German male sprinters
West German male hurdlers
Olympic athletes of West Germany
World Athletics Championships athletes for West Germany
Suicides in Germany
Suicides by poison
Sportspeople from Marburg
Eintracht Frankfurt athletes